Ian Brown (born 8 March 1951) is an artistic director and was chief executive of the West Yorkshire Playhouse in Leeds, West Yorkshire, England.  He took up this post in 2002, succeeding Jude Kelly. He was previously artistic director of the TAG Theatre Company in Glasgow (1984–1988) and the Traverse Theatre in Edinburgh (1988–1999).  He trained at the Central School of Speech and Drama.

References

External links
 

Alumni of the Royal Central School of Speech and Drama
British theatre directors
Living people
1951 births